The University of Wisconsin–Whitewater Warhawks (casually known as the UW–Whitewater Warhawks or  Warhawks) are the athletic teams of the University of Wisconsin–Whitewater. Twenty Warhawk athletic teams compete in NCAA Division III. The Warhawks currently rank third out of all NCAA Division III schools in the NACDA Director's Cup standings.

On May 27, 2014, UW–Whitewater made history as the first NCAA institution in any division to win national championships in men's football, basketball, and baseball in a single academic year.

Football

The Warhawks compete in the WIAC conference of NCAA Division III football. In the 2005 and 2006 seasons, they finished the year undefeated in regular season play, losing only in the Amos Alonzo Stagg Bowls of 2005 and 2006 to the University of Mount Union (then Mount Union College), under former coach and UW–Whitewater alum Bob Berezowitz (UW–Whitewater 1967), who had quarterbacked the UW–Whitewater team as the runner-up in the 1966 National Association of Intercollegiate Athletics playoffs. Following the 2006 season, Berezowitz retired, and alum and former assistant Lance Leipold (UW–Whitewater 1987) was named Warhawk head coach.  The Warhawks opened the 2007 with a victory, then suffered their first regular-season defeat since 2004, 26–16 to NCAA Division II's St. Cloud State. The Warhawks followed this up by going undefeated through the remainder of the season. After finishing the regular season with a 9–1 record and a third consecutive 7–0 WIAC record, the UW–Whitewater Warhawks entered the NCAA Division III playoffs for the third consecutive time. The Warhawks won four home playoff games, including a Dec. 8 repeat home victory over Mary Hardin–Baylor 16–7 in the semi-finals, to earn their third straight trip to the NCAA Division III Championship Game, the Amos Alonzo Stagg Bowl in Salem, Virginia and set up their third championship game against Mount Union College. On Dec. 15, 2007 the Warhawks beat Mount Union 31–21 to win the Division III title and close the 2007 season 14–1. Warhawk running back Justin Beaver won the John Gagliardi Trophy for his performance both on and off the field.

The Warhawks entered the 2008 playoffs with one loss after a last-second loss to UW–Stevens Point that ended UW-Whitewater's WIAC win streak at 27 games. Despite having to travel for some of their playoff contests, the Warhawks won four playoff games, earning a spot in the Stagg Bowl after a victory over Mary Hardin–Baylor 39–13. On Dec. 20, 2008 the Warhawks lost to Mount Union 31–26 in their fourth consecutive Stagg Bowl matchup.

The Warhawks ran the table in 2009 with a perfect record of 15–0, defeating Mount Union in the Stagg Bowl 38–28 to claim their second national title in three years. The string continued in 2010, including a sixth straight WIAC title, and ending with UW–Whitewater’s third NCAA III championship in four years, with a 31–21 win over Mount Union in the Stagg Bowl to finish 15–0 and run the NCAA (all divisions) leading win streak to 30 games. Once again, in 2011, they ran the regular season undefeated, with a seventh straight WIAC title. They then went on the face Mount Union in the Stagg Bowl for the seventh straight season, and won their third straight title, fourth in five years to finish 15–0 again. They raised their win streak to 45 games, which is just 2 behind Oklahoma's historic Division I streak, and is fourth behind Mount Union's separate 55 and 54 game winning streaks in all of college football.

In 2013, the Warhawks faced off with the Purple Raiders of Mount Union in the Stagg Bowl for the eighth time in nine seasons. UW–Whitewater, led by junior quarterback Matt Behrendt, would go on to win by a final score of 52–14 and secure their fifth National Championship, and fourth undefeated season, under coach Leipold.

On December 19, 2014 the Warhawks and Mount Union met again in the Stagg Bowl; the Warhawks won the NCAA DIII Football title over the Raiders, 43–34. This was Leipold's final game as Warhawks head coach, as he had already been announced as the new head coach at Division I FBS school Buffalo.

The Warhawks have won Wisconsin Intercollegiate Athletic Conference Championship 36 times: 1913, 1914, 1922, 1932, 1937, 1940, 1941, 1950, 1959, 1960, 1962, 1966, 1967, 1969, 1974, 1975, 1978, 1980, 1984, 1987, 1988, 1990, 1994, 1997, 1998, 2005, 2006, 2007, 2008, 2009, 2010, 2011, 2013, 2014, 2016, and 2018.

Baseball
Wisconsin–Whitewater has had 14 Major League Baseball Draft selections since the draft began in 1965.

National championships

NCAA Division III
 Women's volleyball 2002, 2005
 Baseball 2005, 2014
 Men's basketball 1984, 1989, 2012, 2014
 Football 2007, 2009, 2010, 2011, 2013, 2014

Other
 Women's Gymnastics 2012, 2013, 2014 (National Collegiate Gymnastics Association Division III)

Notable athletes
 Jeff Jagodzinski, former head football coach for Boston College
 Lance Leipold, former Warhawks head football coach and current head coach at the University at Kansas
 Matt Turk, retired NFL punter .
 Bob Wickman, Major League Baseball relief pitcher
 Derek Stanley, former wide receiver for the St. Louis Rams
 Eric Studesville, current assistant coach, and former interim head coach of the Denver Broncos
 Pete Schmitt, former fullback and tight end for the Washington Redskins
 Justin Beaver, winner of the Gagliardi Trophy (2007)
 Matt Blanchard, former NFL quarterback.
 Jake Kumerow, wide receiver for the Buffalo Bills
Quinn Meinerz, offensive lineman for the Denver Broncos

References

External links